Ayami (written: , , , ,  or  in hiragana) is a feminine Japanese given name. Notable people with the name include:

, Japanese illustrator and video game artist
, Japanese idol and singer
, Japanese actress and model
, Japanese rower
, Japanese baseball player
, Japanese tennis player
, Japanese gymnast

Japanese feminine given names